MV Retriever was a World War II-era Landing Craft Utility transferred to NASA from the U.S. Army. It was used to train United States astronauts for post-splashdown ocean recovery operations and water egress from their command modules during the Gemini and Apollo programs from 1963 to 1972. It operated primarily in Galveston Bay and the Gulf of Mexico.

MV Retriever was one of 500 Mk V LCTs built (numbered, not named). LCU-15301 was acquired by NASA under a reimbursable loan agreement dated March 4, 1963, from the U.S. Army at Ft. Eustis, Virginia.

The sides of the vessel's midsection were cut down, a new bridge built and a hoist added for NASA use. It was under the jurisdiction of the Manned Spacecraft Center's Landing and Recovery Division, and its captains included Frank M. Gammon, Sr., CWO, US Army and Dino E. Bernardi, USCG (1971–72).

In 1972, NASA transferred the MV Retriever to the Virginia Institute of Marine Science (VIMS) in Gloucester, Virginia, where it was used to support marine research in the Chesapeake Bay area until it was retired.

Gallery

References

External links 

NASA vehicles
Landing craft of the United States Navy
Maritime vessels related to spaceflight
1954 ships